Eoophyla diopsalis is a moth in the family Crambidae. It was described by George Hampson in 1897. It is found on New Guinea and Fergusson Island, the Moluccas and Ambon Island.

References

Eoophyla
Moths described in 1897